Each year the California Mr. Basketball award is given to the person chosen as the best high school boys basketball player in the U.S. state of California. Many have gone on to play in the NBA.

Voting is done in a points system. Each voter selects first, second, and third place votes. A player receives five points for each first-place vote, three points for each second-place vote, and one point for a third-place vote. The player who garners the most points receives the award.  The California Mr. Basketball award is the second oldest such award in the nation; only Indiana Mr. Basketball, which was first awarded in 1939, predates it.

Award winners

Most winners by college

 includes multiple winners

Most winners by high school

References 

Mr. and Miss Basketball awards
Awards established in 1950
1950 establishments in California
Lists of people from California
Mr. Basketball